John Harvey (22 July 1821 – 22 June 1899) was a farmer, horse breeder and politician in the early days of the colony of South Australia. He is remembered as the founder of the town of Salisbury, South Australia.

History
Harvey was born in Wick, Caithness, the home town of Sir Josiah Symon Q.C. His father was a native of St. Helena. After a good education he emigrated with Allan MacFarlane's   family to South Australia on the Superb, arriving in October 1839, coincidentally with the Palmira, in which the Spence family were passengers.

In 1844 Harvey went to Gawler, staying at the Old Spot inn. He drove the mail for some time, then bought land on the plains where Bassett Town later stood; he was the only landholder between Dry Creek and Gawler. He took up a run from Port Gawler to Mount Torrens, which he made available to overlanders for agistment of their cattle and acted as stock agent for some. He next started growing wheat, which proved quite lucrative until farms in Mount Barker, Lyndoch and Aldinga stepped up production and the price dropped from 9/- to 2/6d. per bushel in 1846.

He built houses for settlers and the first stone building in Gawler. He opened a butcher's shop in Gawler. He purchased land and subdivided it as  blocks, then in 1856 laid out a township, named for Salisbury in England, near his wife's home town. Neales was his auctioneer. He built churches and a graveyard. He also laid out the coastal village of St Kilda.

He was appointed Justice of the Peace and was often called upon to act as magistrate.

Although not a gambling man, he was, with his friend Seth Ferry, one of the colony's best judges of horseflesh. He was the owner of Oediputes, The Ghost and Beda, winner in 1855 of the first Adelaide St. Leger, and the dam of several champions. He was on the committee of the Gawler Jockey Club, and occasionally acted as starter and judge. He was actively involved in the various Agricultural Show societies, and regularly acted as judge of horses.

He was member for Yatala in the South Australian House of Assembly from 1857 to 1860. He was involved with Robert Torrens in formulating the Real Property Act (later "Torrens Title") and active in promoting it in parliament. He was also prominent in the foundation of the District Council system in South Australia.

Family
He married Ann Pitman (9 June 1826 – 14 August 1917). Their children were:
James Harvey (9 December 1843 – 30 December 1926) He served as Clerk of the Yatala North District Council and Returning Officer for Yatala.
John Harvey (12 April 1845 – 29 November 1927) had "Sans Souci" station on the Little Para.
Mary Ann Harvey (1 Nov 1847 – 28 May 1931) married J. H. Bagster
William Salisbury Harvey (1848–) moved to Western Australia
Allan Harvey (1850–)

References 

Members of the South Australian House of Assembly
Australian racehorse owners and breeders
Australian farmers
1821 births
1899 deaths
19th-century Australian politicians